Marc Vignal (born 21 December 1933 in Nogent-sur-Marne) is a noted French musicologist, writer and radio producer for France Musique and program manager at Radio France (1975–99), a journalist for Harmony (1964–84), Le Monde de la musique (1985–2009) and Classica (2009–). He collaborated in the writing of Fayard Guides: symphonic, sacred, chamber and piano under the direction of François-René Tranchefort, including French and translated The Classical Style by Charles Rosen  (Gallimard, 1978, repr. 2000), and Bach Interpretation by Paul Badura-Skoda (Buchet-Chastel 1999). Vignal is the author of numerous lectures, articles and books on music and musicians.

Works 
Selected works include:
Joseph Haydn – Seghers 1964
Jean Sibelius – Seghers 1965
Mahler – The Threshold 1966, repr. 1995
Dictionary of music under the direction of Marc Vignal 1982
Dictionary of musicians under the direction of Marc Vignal – Larousse 1985
Joseph Haydn, the man and his work – Fayard 1988
Bach's son – Fayard 1997
Joseph Haydn – First & Autobiography Biography, Translated and introduced by Marc Vignal Aubier-Flammarion 1997
Haydn and Mozart – Fayard 2001
Muzio Clementi – Fayard Mirare 2003
Jean Sibelius – Fayard 2004
Beethoven and Vienna – Fayard Mirare 2004
Michael Haydn – Bleu Nuit 2009
Antonio Salieri –  Bleu Nuit 2014

References 

Living people
20th-century French musicologists
21st-century French musicologists
1933 births
People from Nogent-sur-Marne
French radio producers
French male writers
Radio France people